Lilijana Kozlovič (born 30 October 1962) is a Slovenian politician. She served as Minister of Justice in the 14th Government of Slovenia.

References 

Living people
1962 births
Place of birth missing (living people)
Justice ministers of Slovenia
21st-century Slovenian women politicians
21st-century Slovenian politicians
Female justice ministers
Women government ministers of Slovenia